The 1991 Arab Athletics Championships was the seventh edition of the international athletics competition between Arab countries. It took place in Latakia, Syria from 1–4 October. A total of 39 athletics events were contested, 23 for men and 16 for women.

The marathon race was held on a short course in Latakia, and was ultimately dropped at the following edition. The men's 50 kilometres race walk (introduced in 1987) was removed from the programme, while the women's 100 metres hurdles was not held due to a lack of entries. The women's 10,000 metres and marathon, which were held in 1989, did not return on this occasion.

Medal summary

Men

 The marathon course was not the official 42.195 km distance so times were not eligible for records. The medals were still distributed.

Women

Medal table

Overall

Men

Women

References

Results
 Al Batal Al Arabi (N°:34). Arab Athletics Union. Retrieved on 2015-02-14.

Arab Athletics Championships
International athletics competitions hosted by Syria
Sport in Latakia
Arab Athletics Championships
Arab Athletics Championships
Arab Athletics Championships